Vikram Sethi is an American author and cyber security specialist. He is a professor of information systems and supply chain management and former director of the Institute of Defense Studies and Education at Wright State University. He also served as an advisor to the dean.

Education
Vikram Sethi received his Bachelor of Electrical Engineering from Thapar Institute of Engineering and Technology, India. He earned his MBA from Wright State University and a PhD from the Joseph M. Katz Graduate School of Business, University of Pittsburgh, Pennsylvania.

Career
Sethi began his teaching career as an assistant professor at Southwest Missouri State University (renamed Missouri State University, Springfield, MO).  He later became associate professor and PhD coordinator at the College of Business, University of Texas at Arlington between 1999 and 2003. He joined the Raj Soin College of Business at Wright State University in 2003 as a department chair and professor of information systems and operations management. In 2006, he founded the Institute of Defense Studies and Education at Wright State University and served as its director until 2017. The institute supports the US Department of Defense, commercial industry and others by employing experts from government, the military, academia and the private sector. The institute has R&D capabilities in automatic-identification technologies and sensor space. In October 2011, the institute hired retired US Air Force commander, Major General Gary T. McCoy to serve as senior adviser and help develop its educational programs. In September 2015, the institute was part of a consortium, led by Fairfax, Virginia-based SRA International Inc., that was awarded a U.S. Army contract worth up to $181 million for providing automatic-identification technologies and service to help the military track, locate and monitor parts and equipment. In September 2015, Wright State University’s Institute of Defense Studies and Education was part of a consortium, led by Fairfax, Virginia-based SRA International, that was awarded a U.S. Army contract worth up to $181 million for providing automatic-identification technologies and service to help the military track, locate and monitor parts.

Sethi also served as Director, Data Intensive Supply Chain Research 
Center of the University, whose focus is on supply chains that are strongly supported by information technology and data, including RFID. Additionally, he manages the university's supply chain program which offers certifications in nine subject areas. Besides, he was on the board of the Dayton RFID Convergence Center, a business incubator dedicated to RFID technology.

Sethi also set up Wright State University’s Center of Professional Education in 2007 and serves as its director. One of his early accomplishments was the development of a Stress Management and Determination Inventory (SMDI), a psychological assessment of stress in information systems professionals that combines 33 stress factors into a single scale. He also came up with the MAP3 System to assist organizations with the task of process simplification and prioritization through the isolation of bottlenecks in business processes.

Sethi has over 20 years of experience in advising many startups in the US in areas like growth strategy, funding, cash allocation, product development, and market positioning.  He is a guest speaker at educational institutions around the world.  He has traveled to India, UAE, Singapore, Australia, China, Japan, South Korea, and Malaysia as an invited faculty member. He serves on Advisory Boards of several regional organizations such as the Global Water Consortium.

His research interests include the following:
 Cyber security
 Defense studies
 Data-intensive supply chains
 Global business development
 Global information systems
 Human capital management
 Organizational transformation
 Project risk assessment of information systems

Publications
Sethi has written several books on cybercrime and organizational transformation, and published more than 50 articles in peer-reviewed journals. He continues to call for the establishment of a global cyber regime capable of mitigating the growing risks of cyber war and manage the cyber polity of diverse nations. In his book, Weapons of Mass Psychological Destruction and the People Who Use Them, he discusses the shift from kinetic war to cyber war using numerous case studies.  He writes, “cyber war is already upon us,” adding that nothing short of a robust, multinational, cyber regime can change its long-term direction. He has also highlighted the extreme vulnerability of small and medium businesses, especially in the Dayton area, to cyber attacks. More recently, he underscored the growing threat from readymade ransomware available on the dark web

Books
Sethi, Vikram (2020). Cyber Fear, Trauma, and Psychosis: A Book of Case Studies (upcoming release)
Sethi, Vikram (2020). Cyber Weapons of Mass Psychological Destruction: And the People Who Use Them, Greylander Press, LLC.
Sethi, Vikram (2015). Weapons of Mass Psychological Destruction and the People Who Use Them (Practical and Applied Psychology. Praeger Publishing.  
Sethi, Vikram (1998). Organizational Transformation Through Business Process Reengineering: Applying Lessons Learned. Pearson College Division.

References

American writers
Year of birth missing (living people)
Living people